Vanda Skuratovich (1925, Raubichy – 12 January 2010, Minsk) was a Belarusian Roman Catholic activist. 

During the Second World War she served as a partisan in Piotr Masherau's unit.  She reportedly rescued a Jewish family from being deported to a concentration camp.

After the war, Skuratovich was a staunch activist, organizing religious ceremonies, largely forbidden by Soviet authorities at that time, at her home. She actively participated in the campaign by Belarusian Roman Catholics demanding return of the Kalvaryja Church in Minsk, which was returned to the Catholic Church in 1980.

Vanda Skuratovich died in Minsk on 12 January 2010, aged 84.

References

External links
 Vanda Skuratovich – her activity to save Jews' lives during the Holocaust, at Yad Vashem website

1925 births
2010 deaths
Belarusian anti-communists
Belarusian Roman Catholics
Belarusian partisans
People from Minsk
Catholic Righteous Among the Nations